Zirconocene dichloride is an organozirconium compound composed of a zirconium central atom, with two cyclopentadienyl and two chloro ligands. It is a colourless diamagnetic solid that is somewhat stable in air.

Preparation and structure
Zirconocene dichloride may be prepared from zirconium(IV) chloride-THF complex and sodium cyclopentadienide:

ZrCl4(THF)2 + 2 NaCp → Cp2ZrCl2 + 2 NaCl + 2 THF
The closely related compound Cp2ZrBr2 was first described by Birmingham and Wilkinson.

The compound is a bent metallocene: the Cp rings are not parallel, the average Cp(centroid)-M-Cp angle being 128°. The Cl-Zr-Cl angle of 97.1° is wider than in niobocene dichloride (85.6°) and molybdocene dichloride (82°). This trend helped to establish the orientation of the HOMO in this class of complex.

Reactions

Schwartz's reagent
Zirconocene dichloride reacts with lithium aluminium hydride to give Cp2ZrHCl Schwartz's reagent:
(C5H5)2ZrCl2 + 1/4 LiAlH4 → (C5H5)2ZrHCl + 1/4 LiAlCl4

Since lithium aluminium hydride is a strong reductant, some over-reduction occurs to give the dihydrido complex, Cp2ZrH2; treatment of the product mixture with methylene chloride converts it to Schwartz's reagent.

Negishi reagent
Zirconocene dichloride can also be used to prepare the Negishi reagent, Cp2Zr(η2-butene), which can be used as a source of Cp2Zr in oxidative cyclisation reactions. The Negishi reagent is prepared by treating zirconocene dichloride with n-BuLi, leading to replacement of the two chloride ligands with butyl groups. The dibutyl compound subsequently undergoes beta-hydride  elimination to give one η2-butene ligand, with the other butyl ligand promptly lost as butane via reductive elimination.

Carboalumination 
Zirconocene dichloride catalyzes the carboalumination of alkynes by trimethylaluminum to give a (alkenyl)dimethylalane, a versatile intermediate for further cross coupling reactions for the synthesis of stereodefined trisubstituted olefins.  For example, α-farnesene can be prepared as a single stereoisomer by carboalumination of 1-buten-3-yne with trimethylaluminum, followed by palladium-catalyzed coupling of the resultant vinylaluminum reagent with geranyl chloride.  

The use of trimethylaluminum for this reaction results in exclusive formation of the syn-addition product and, for terminal alkynes, the anti-Markovnikov addition with high selectivity (generally > 10:1).  Unfortunately, the use of higher alkylaluminum reagents results in lowered yield, due to the formation of the hydroalumination product (via β-hydrogen elimination of the alkylzirconium intermediate) as side product, and only moderate regioselectivities.  Thus, practical applications of the carboalumination reaction are generally confined to the case of methylalumination.  Although this is a major limitation, the synthetic utility of this process remains significant, due to the frequent appearance of methyl-substituted alkenes in natural products.

Zr-walk 
Zirconocene dichloride together with a reducing reagent can form the zirconocene hydride catalyst in situ, which allows a positional isomerization (so-called "Zr-walk"), and ends up with a cleavage of allylic bonds. Not only individual steps under stoichiometric conditions were described with Schwartz reagent, and Negishi reagent, but also catalytic applications on alkene hydroaluminations, radical cyclisation,  polybutadiene cleavage, and reductive removal of functional groups were reported.

References

Further reading

Organozirconium compounds
Metallocenes
Metal halides
Chloro complexes
Cyclopentadienyl complexes
Zirconium(IV) compounds